USS Rodgers was an American 420-ton steam whaler. The "other vessels" of most immediate concern were two whalers, Vigilant and Mount Wollaston missing in the Arctic Ocean since 1879.

Characteristics 
The vessel purchased was the whaler Mary and Helen, specifically built for Arctic navigation by Goss, Sawyer & Packard of Bath, Maine. Launched on 17 July 1879, she was the first steam whaler built as such for American registry and during her first, and only, season not only justified the faith of her owner, Captain William Lewis of New Bedford, Massachusetts, but revolutionized the American whaling industry.

Career

Search for Jeannette 
Acquired by the Navy at San Francisco, the whaler Mary and Helen was renamed Rodgers and commissioned on 30 May 1881, Lieutenant Robert M. Berry in command. She sailed north on 16 June, and arrived at Petropavlovsk 33 days later, where the captain of the Russian corvette Streloch offered "any needed assistance" on behalf of his government.

Continuing on, Rodgers took on two Chukchis as hunters and dog drivers at Saint Lawrence Bay, and on 20 August, entered the Arctic Ocean. Wrangel Land was next. As they looked for clues of the missing ship, the crew of Rodgers surveyed the area and proved that Wrangel was an island and not the southern edge of a polar land mass.

Rodgers departed the island on 13 September, and moved north and west until stopped by pack ice on the 18th. Returning to Wrangell, she continued the search on another course until the 27th. Again blocked by ice, she turned south for winter quarters. The first week in October she left a party, under Master Charles F. Putnam, on Tiapka Island off Cape Serdze with provisions, supplies, and fuel for a year; and a boat, dogs, and sleds to explore the coast westward in search of the crews of Jeanette and the missing whalers.

Burning 

On 8 October 1881, Rodgers steamed for Saint Lawrence Bay, where bad weather prevented the transfer of a large part of her provisions and supplies to the shore. On 30 November, fire broke out in the still tightly-packed hold. Through the day, stores were removed to ease the firefighting efforts, but at midnight, the fires still raged and the former whaler was abandoned.

Rodgers then drifted up the bay, her rigging and sails ablaze. Early the next day her magazine exploded. Later divided into four parties, most of the crew wintered there and in three nearby villages.

As the crew adjusted to life ashore, Lieutenant Berry set out to inform Putnam's camp of the fire. Meanwhile, Master Putnam had learned of the disaster and had started for the Bay with supplies for the relief of survivors. Putnam reached Saint Lawrence Bay, but on returning to his camp lost his way in a blizzard and drifted out to sea on an ice floe. An unsuccessful, month-long search for him was conducted along the coast.

Aftermath 

On 8 February 1882, a party under Lieutenant Berry—who had not yet learned of Putnam's loss—set out on another search along the coast for Jeanettes crew. On 24 March, they arrived at the Russian post at Nishne and learned of the landing of part of Jeanettes crew at the mouth of the Lena River the previous September. Berry and his party then returned home from Nishne.

The remaining members of the crew departed Saint Lawrence Bay in May on board the New Bedford whaler North Star and were subsequently transferred to the revenue cutter . They returned to San Francisco by way of Sitka, Alaska.  During the stop at Sitka, the two surgeons of the Rodgers were kept busy dealing with local epidemics of measles and scarlet fever.

On 12 March 1883, Congress appropriated $3,000 to "suitably reward the natives at and about Saint Lawrence Bay who housed, fed, and extended other kindness to the officers and men of USS Rodgers."

Rodgers Harbor on Wrangel Island was named after this ship.

References

Footnotes

Sources

External links 

 

 

1879 ships
Arctic exploration vessels
Barques of the United States Navy
Jeannette expedition
Maritime incidents in December 1881
Ship fires
Ships built in Bath, Maine
Shipwrecks in the Bering Sea
Shipwrecks of Russia
Steamships of the United States Navy
Whaling ships